Monori Sportegyesület is a professional football club based in Monor, Pest county, Hungary, that competes in the Nemzeti Bajnokság III, the third tier of Hungarian football.

Name changes
1901–1906: Monor Sport Club
1906–?: Monor Sportegyesület
?–1940: Monor Sport Egylet
1940–1944: Monori MOVE TSE
1945–1947: Monori Munkás SE
1947–1951: Monori SzSE
1948: merger with Monori Barátság
1951–1953: Monori Építők
1953–1955: Monori Vörös Meteor
1991: merger with Dány
?–1998: Monor-Ecker SE
1998–2001: Monor-Ilzer SE
2001–2002: Monor Sáma SE
2002–present: Monori Sportegyesület

Honours
Nemzeti Bajnokság III:

Season results
As of 6 August 2017

External links
 Profile on Magyar Futball

References

Football clubs in Hungary
Association football clubs established in 1901
1901 establishments in Hungary